Arthur Peake Centre (Connex) is an alternate secondary school in Maple Ridge part of School District 42 Maple Ridge-Pitt Meadows. It is located on 116th Ave., across from Thomas Haney Secondary School.

High schools in British Columbia
Maple Ridge, British Columbia
Educational institutions in Canada with year of establishment missing